China Foreign Affairs University (CFAU) is a public university for diplomats located in Beijing, China. It is jointly administrated by the Ministry of Foreign Affairs and the Ministry of Education. It is a Chinese state Double First Class University Plan university identified by the Ministry of Education of China.

Since its foundation, there have been over 300 ambassadors and thousands of senior diplomats and  counselors among the alumni of CFAU, gaining the university a reputation as "the cradle of Chinese diplomats." At present, CFAU has two campuses. The first began operating in 1956; the second one came into service in 2012.

History 

China Foreign Affairs University was founded in 1955 with the advice of then-Premier Zhou Enlai, and is affiliated with the Ministry of Foreign Affairs (the university is not to be confused with the University of International Relations, also in Beijing). The predecessor of CFAU was the Department of Diplomacy of Renmin University of China. Vice Premier and Foreign Minister of China Chen Yi was the president of the university from 1961 to 1969. The University was forced to close during the years of Cultural Revolution. It was reopened in 1980 under the auspices of Deng Xiaoping. Most of the former presidents of CFAU are ambassadors. Before 2005, the university was called the Foreign Affairs College in English.

Academic 
The courses of study offered include foreign languages (English, French and Japanese), foreign policy, international politics and relations and diplomacy, international law and economics. The university awards BA, MA and PhD degrees.

China Foreign Affairs University also holds short-term courses for Chinese civil servants and for foreign diplomats. For example, in 2005, it has trained diplomats for the new governments created after the U.S. invasion of Afghanistan and Iraq for one month each.

Model United Nations 
Model United Nations (MUN) is the most renowned student activity of CFAU. On June 3, 1995, CFAU organized the 1st Model United Nations Conference. It was the first of its kind held in China and attended by Chinese students.

In 2002, together with UN Association of China, CFAU organized the 1st Beijing Model United Nations Conference (BMUN. Its name changed into Beijing International Model United Nations (BIMUN) since 2017). It was the first inter-university MUN in China and was later listed as one of the three most prestigious university MUNs.

In 2004, CFAU again cooperated with UN Association of China and hosted the 1st China Model United Nations Conference (CNMUN).

Praise and criticism 
 On July 1, 2008, then UN Secretary-General Ban Ki-Moon praised CFAU as "the cradle of Chinese diplomacy; an institution that has firmly established itself as an authoritative forum in active and inter-active discussions on issues concerning China and its expanding role in the international community" in his address given at the university.
 Former French President Jacques Chirac on April 29, 2009 called CFAU “the institute of higher education which cultivates top talents for Chinese diplomacy." 
 US Ambassador to China Gary Faye Locke celebrated CFAU as "China’s incubator of diplomatic talent" at the Opening Ceremony of U.S.-China Joint Training Program for Afghan Diplomats at CFAU.

In recent years, CFAU has been criticized for putting too much emphasis on the study of foreign languages at the cost of diplomatic training and education, and some consider many Chinese foreign affairs personnel no more than translators or interpreters.

Fund scandal 
In 2013, during a thorough investigation by the National Audit Office of the PRC, noncompliance was discovered in the procurement of the Ministry of Foreign Affairs, involving more than 52 million RMB. Among them, about 38 million RMB was associated with the construction of CFAU's new campus in Shahe.

Disputes over "the cradle of Chinese diplomats"
CFAU has produced an array of senior diplomatic officials and proudly claims itself as "the cradle of Chinese diplomats." However, having trained hundreds of Chinese ambassadors, Beijing Foreign Studies University (BFSU) also considers itself "the cradle of PRC diplomats." Disputes between students of the two universities continue to present day.

On September 10, 2012, then Chinese Premier Wen Jiabao wrote an inscription of "the cradle of Chinese diplomats" and dedicated it to CFAU after he gave an address. Many CFAU students believe it is an endorsement of the University being the true "cradle of Chinese diplomats."

References

External links

 
  

 
1955 establishments in China
Educational institutions established in 1955
Universities and colleges in Beijing